Khabibulla Nizamov (uzb. Xabibulla Nizamov Xamidullayevich born 1 September 1978) is an Uzbek professional bodybuilder, mas wrestling athlete and actor. He is the President of Bodybuilding and Fitness Federation of Tashkent, honoured worker of UzFBF and a multiple medallist in national and international bodybuilding competitions.

Biography 
Khabibulla Nizamov was born in Tashkent and he started his sports career in Karate. In 2006, he started his bodybuilding career and he began participating at bodybuilding tournaments when he was 26 years old.  His first international competition was World Amateur Championships – IFBB that was held in Qatar, Doha. He graduated from Tashkent State University of Economics. He is married and he has 4 children; 3 daughters and 1 son.

Filmography 
Khabibulla Nizamov started appearing in Uzbek movies at late 2010 as a bodyguard, coach and trainer. He  gained wide recognition and fame in Uzbekistan in 2010–2012 after starring in the Uzbek drama films  "Dada" and "Dilor".

Competitions 
2009 World Amateur Championships – IFBB, Light-HeavyWeight, Doha, Qatar.

2010 Arnold Amateur – IFBB, Light-HeavyWeight, OHIO, USA

2012 Asian Amateur Championships – IFBB, Super-HeavyWeight, 6th

2012 Uzbekistan Cup Bodybuilding -Tashkent, Uzbekistan 1st

2013 Proform Classic Festival – Night of Champions Tashkent, Uzbekistan 

2013 – Asian Bodybuilding Amateuer Championship Almaty, Kazakhstan 2nd 

2019 11th WBPF Championship South Korea, Cheju

2020 Arnold Classic Championship International MAS Wrestling, CA, US

References

External links 

 
 Khabibulla Nizamov Official Instagram page
Khabibulla Nizamov Official Facebook  page

1978 births
Living people
Uzbekistani bodybuilders
Male bodybuilders
21st-century Uzbekistani male actors
Professional bodybuilders
Uzbekistani male film actors